TWDY may refer to:

 This Will Destroy You, an American avant-rock band
 The Whole Damn Yay, an American hip hop supergroup formed by Ant Banks